Gumulya is an Indonesian surname. Notable people with the surname include:

 Beatrice Gumulya (born 1991), Indonesian tennis player
 Sandy Gumulya (born 1986), Indonesian tennis player

Indonesian-language surnames